The Bethel Baptist Church near Clay Village, Kentucky is a historic church which was built in 1899.  It was added to the National Register of Historic Places in 1988.

It is a three-bay nave-plan church with a projecting vestibule.  It has Gothic Revival details.  The church was founded or built in 1797;  this church building was rebuilt in 1899.

References

Baptist churches in Kentucky
National Register of Historic Places in Shelby County, Kentucky
Gothic Revival church buildings in Kentucky
Churches completed in 1899
19th-century Baptist churches in the United States
Churches in Shelby County, Kentucky
Churches on the National Register of Historic Places in Kentucky
1899 establishments in Kentucky